Farhan Asghar (born 15 September 1980) is a Pakistani former cricketer. He played for Lahore Lions and Lahore Ravi. His highest score in List A cricket was 64. He played his last game in cricket against Zarai Taraqiati Bank Limited. A wicket-keeper batsman, Asghar scored 410 not out during a district cricket match for Lahore East Zone Whites against Lahore West Zone Whites in 2012. That score remains one of the 50 highest scores ever recorded in cricket.

References

Living people
1980 births
Pakistani cricketers
Lahore Lions cricketers
Lahore Ravi cricketers
Service Industries cricketers
Sui Northern Gas Pipelines Limited cricketers
Cricketers from Lahore